Early onset dementia is dementia in which symptoms first appear before the age of 65. The term favored until about 2000 was presenile dementia; young onset dementia is also used.

Early onset dementia may be caused by degenerative or vascular disease, or it may be due to other causes, such as alcohol-related dementia and other inflammatory or infectious processes. Early-onset Alzheimer's disease, vascular dementia and frontotemporal lobar degeneration are the most common forms of early onset dementia, with Alzheimer's accounting for between 30 and 40%. Early onset dementia may also occur, less frequently, in the Lewy body dementias (dementia with Lewy bodies and Parkinson's disease dementia), multiple sclerosis, Huntington's disease and other conditions.

References

Further reading
 
 
 
 

Cognitive disorders
Dementia